Central Canada Comic Con (C4) was an annual fan convention held in Winnipeg, Manitoba.

History
This show began to grow in 1994 as a simple weekend trade show called the Manitoba Collector's Expo. Back in 1994 it showcased everything from sports cards to antiques to toys and comic books. As times changed, so did the event, and in 2000 it became the Manitoba Toy & Comic Expo, dropping the antiques and reducing the sports cards.

In 2006, the show expanded as the Manitoba Comic Con, and brought in attendees from all over Manitoba and North Dakota. The show focused on toys, comic books, gaming, anime, and local artists.

In 2007 it brought in the media aspect with David Prowse, Richard Hatch and Margot Kidder.

In 2008 it moved to the Winnipeg Convention Centre with guests like Lou Ferrigno, Jeremy Bulloch, LeVar Burton, Erica Durance, Justin Hartley, Charlie Adler and John de Lancie.

The Central Canada Comic Con was Central Canada's largest convention celebrating the best in comic books, science fiction, gaming, anime, fantasy, horror and pop culture.

Wizard World purchased the convention shortly after the 2010 show, but dropped out in June 2011.

In 2013 C4 received the "Winnipeg Tourism Marketing Campaign (under $2500) Award of Distinction", presented to a tourism individual, organization, business or marketing consortium in recognition of a creative or innovative marketing campaign.

In 2019, C4 announced that it would not hold a show in 2020. In November 2019, CapeFlow Productions (organizers of the Montreal Comiccon and Ottawa Comiccon) announced that it would hold a new event as a de facto successor to C4, Winnipeg Comiccon, inheriting C4's previous late-October scheduling.

Event history

References

External links
Central Canada Comic Con

Comics conventions in Canada
Culture of Winnipeg
Recurring events established in 2006
2006 establishments in Manitoba
Fall events in Canada